Hartselle is the second largest city in Morgan County, Alabama, United States,  south of Decatur. It is part of the Decatur Metropolitan Area and the Huntsville-Decatur Combined Statistical Area.

As of the 2020 census, the population of the city was 15,455. Hartselle was founded in 1869 with the arrival of the South and North Alabama Railroad. It takes its name from George Hartselle, one of the railroad's owners. The post office opened in 1873. It was formally incorporated on March 1, 1875. Most of the oldest buildings were destroyed by a disastrous fire in 1916.

Geography
Hartselle is located in western Morgan County at  (34.440383, -86.940385). It is in the north-central part of the state along Interstate 65, which runs from south to north through the easternmost parts of the city, with access from exits 325 and 328. U.S. Route 31 is the main north-south highway through the center of town, leading north  to Decatur, the Morgan county seat, and south  to Cullman. Alabama State Route 36, Main Street, is the main east-west route through downtown, leading east  to Lacey's Spring and west the same distance to Moulton.

Demographics

2000 census
At the 2000 census there were 12,019 people, 4,816 households, and 3,534 families living in the city. The racial makeup of the city was 92.25% White, 5.16% Black or African American, 0.63% Native American, 0.31% Asian, 0.02% Pacific Islander, 0.33% from other races, and 1.31% from two or more races. 1.29% of the population were Hispanic or Latino of any race.

Of the 4,814 households 35.5% had children under the age of 18 living with them, 59.1% were married couples living together, 10.9% had a female householder with no husband present, and 26.6% were non-families. 24.4% of households were one person and 11.2% were one person aged 65 or older. The average household size was 2.49 and the average family size was 2.97.

The age distribution was 25.5% under the age of 18, 7.7% from 18 to 24, 29.3% from 25 to 44, 23.5% from 45 to 64, and 14.0% 65 or older. The median age was 37 years. For every 100 females, there were 92.3 males. For every 100 females age 18 and over, there were 88.8 males.

The median household income was $40,461 and the median family income  was $47,685. Males had a median income of $40,211 versus $24,124 for females. The per capita income for the city was $20,727. About 6.6% of families and 8.6% of the population were below the poverty line, including 8.8% of those under age 18 and 11.9% of those age 65 or over.

2010 census
At the 2010 census there were 14,255 people, 5,678 households, and 4,128 families living in the city. The racial makeup of the city was 91.5% White, 4.3% Black or African American, 0.8% Native American, 0.4% Asian, 0.0% Pacific Islander, 1.3% from other races, and 1.7% from two or more races. 2.5% of the population were Hispanic or Latino of any race.

Of the 5,678 households 33.7% had children under the age of 18 living with them, 57.2% were married couples living together, 11.2% had a female householder with no husband present, and 27.3% were non-families. 24.4% of households were one person and 10.7% were one person aged 65 or older. The average household size was 2.51 and the average family size was 2.97.

The age distribution was 25.4% under the age of 18, 7.5% from 18 to 24, 26.2% from 25 to 44, 26.8% from 45 to 64, and 14.2% 65 or older. The median age was 38.7 years. For every 100 females, there were 93.2 males. For every 100 females age 18 and over, there were 93.7 males.

The median household income was $47,306 and the median family income  was $57,585. Males had a median income of $47,343 versus $28,855 for females. The per capita income for the city was $21,746. About 9.4% of families and 11.7% of the population were below the poverty line, including 12.8% of those under age 18 and 14.9% of those age 65 or over.

2020 census

As of the 2020 United States census, there were 15,455 people, 5,518 households, and 3,930 families residing in the city.

Notable people 
 Jill Alper, electoral strategist
 Wilford S. Bailey, former NCAA president and former Auburn University president
 Scott Beason, member of Alabama Senate from 2006 to 2014
 Jay Burleson, filmmaker
 William Bradford Huie, journalist, editor, publisher and author
 Don Logan, former chairman of Time Warner Media and Communications Group, owner Bass Anglers Sportsman Society
 Mortal Treason, Christian metal band
 Tommy Ed Roberts, businessman and legislator
 Destin Sandlin, YouTuber and USAF engineer
 John Sparkman, congressman, senator, and 1952 vice-presidential nominee
 Steve Woodard, former MLB pitcher

References

External links

Hartselle Chamber of Commerce

Cities in Alabama
Cities in Morgan County, Alabama
Decatur metropolitan area, Alabama
Populated places established in 1870
1870 establishments in Alabama